Coco Gauff and Caty McNally were the reigning champions, having won the last edition in 2019, but chose not to defend their title.

Greet Minnen and Alison Van Uytvanck won the title, defeating Erin Routliffe and Kimberley Zimmermann in the final, 6–3, 6–3.

Seeds

Draw

Draw

References

External Links
 Draw

2021 Doubles
BGL Luxembourg Open – Doubles